Waddell's chronology or Waddell's king list is an Ancient Near Eastern chronology developed by the British Laurence Waddell in his book, Egyptian Civilization: Its Sumerian Origin and Real Chronology, published in 1930.

Waddell's correlations have not been generally accepted or well regarded. Conventional lists separate Sargon from Menes by around five hundred years. Commenting on this and other works, the Dictionary of National Biography says "These works, containing much painstaking research and impressive to many, did not win the approval of experts."

Waddell's primary chronology was compiled from various Sumerian king lists, Egyptian list of pharaohs, the Bhagavata Purana, Mahabharata, Rigveda and numerous Indus Valley civilization seals and other monuments and relics and sources, some of which he had deciphered himself. It was entitled "Dated Chronological List of Sumerian or Early Aryan Kings from the Rise of Civilization to the Kassi Dynasty" and documented an alleged list of world emperors as follows:

References

External links
Aryan Myth and Metahistory Blog
Irishoriginsofcivilization.com Appendix about Waddell
Frontiers of Anthropology Blog

1930 works
Chronology
King lists
Iraq-related lists
Sumerian kings
Legendary monarchs
Lists of monarchs
Ancient Egyptian priests
Pharaohs
Ancient Egypt-related lists
Lists of Indian monarchs
India history-related lists